Scientology is an edited volume about the Church of Scientology and the beliefs and movement called Scientology. It was edited by James R. Lewis, and published in March 2009 by Oxford University Press. In addition to Lewis, other contributors to the book include J. Gordon Melton, William Sims Bainbridge, Douglas E. Cowan, David G. Bromley, Anson Shupe, James T. Richardson, and Susan J. Palmer. Scientology gives an overview and introduction to the organization, and presents an analysis of the movement from the perspective of sociology. The book compares the organization to religious movements, and goes over its history of controversy. It delves into the practices of the organization and the activities undertaken at its facilities.

Scientology was given an unfavorable review in the International Journal of Cultic Studies, which considered the book unduly biased in Scientology's favour, a view echoed in a review in the magazine Private Eye. It received a positive review in Alternative Spirituality and Religion Review, describing it as "the most sophisticated academic item published on Scientology" to date, a book to be read by journalists and academics alike, and "the most important collection of scholarly articles on Scientology published so far – in any language".

Editor
At the time of the book's publication, James R. Lewis was employed as a lecturer in the subject of philosophy at the University of Wisconsin–Stevens Point.

Contents
Contributors to the book include: J. Gordon Melton, James R. Lewis, William Sims Bainbridge, Douglas E. Cowan, David G. Bromley, Anson Shupe, James T. Richardson, and Susan J. Palmer. Billed by Oxford University Press as "the only comprehensive resource for scholars, students, and others interested in this controversial and little-understood religious movement", Scientology is organized into seven main parts (discounting the introduction and appendix), each containing several essays. Part I, "Introductory Essays", presents an overview and introduction to Scientology and the life of its founder. The second part covers "Theoretical and Quantitative Approaches", examining Scientology's soteriology as well as the degree to which Scientology can be said to be growing. The third part focuses on the "Community and Practices" of Scientology, while the fourth part, "Sources and Comparative Approaches", examines Scientology's religious claims. Part V is focused on "Controversy", such as Scientology's battles with the anti-cult movement and court cases in different countries concerning Scientology's recognition or lack of recognition as a religion. The sixth part analyzes the organization's activities in its "International Missions", while the seventh examines "Dimensions of Scientology", including a chapter on the Xenu myth.

Various chapters comment on Scientology's growth. Lewis puts forth the assertion that the movement is growing at a "healthy—but not a spectacular—rate" (22 percent over the period from 1990 to 2001, from 45,000 to 55,000 according to an American survey of religious self-identification), and states that contrary to the Church's own claims, it is "clearly not the world's fastest growing". William Sims Bainbridge, a sociologist, asserts that Scientology has experienced growth along the West Coast of the United States. Bainbridge looked at statistical data on the percentage of websites managed by Scientologists, and his studies revealed that the most significant portion was in the Pacific Northwest and the state of California. According to Bainbridge, the experience of Scientology founder L. Ron Hubbard in science fiction writing combined with the Church of Scientology's skill with the "emerging cyberculture" might lead to ways that the organization can change in a future that further utilizes technology. In a section of the book on dealings of the organization in Denmark, researchers found that there was a decrease in the number of people joining the organization, and that the number of dedicated Scientologists in the country remained steady for the past two decades. University of Copenhagen researchers Rie Wallendorf and Peter B. Andersen write that the Church of Scientology in Denmark is wary of those external to the organization, and that this detracts from the likelihood that new members will join.

Charles De Gaulle University researcher Régis Dericquebourg writes that when compared to the Scientology practice of "Auditing", other ceremonies carried out by the organization have more restricted levels of participation. According to Dericquebourg, these Scientology ceremonies include social functions which are frequented mainly by "elite members". University Michel de Montaigne researcher Bernardette Rigal-Cellard investigated the various Scientology missions and determined that these missions operated with a United States-based type of methodology. This form of organizational structure and operational tactics is seen as not working well in areas where the U.S. is not seen favorably, including sections of Western Europe, but agreeable to locations sympathetic to American culture.

Critical reception

Reviews in scholarly journals

Review by Terra Manca
Scientology was given a negative review by Terra Manca writing in the International Journal of Cultic Studies, the journal of the International Cultic Studies Association. Manca wrote, "it is most likely to please persons who take an uncritical view of Scientology." Of the lack of standards of research utilized in the book, the review stated, "far too many contributors in this volume fail to critically assess the data that they gather, thereby falling short of providing evidence that has undergone rigorous academic inquiry. Without rigor or critical assessment, a book such as this one (about a supposed new religious movement [NRM]) risks becoming pro-NRM propaganda." Manca's review put forth the argument, "although this book brings needed academic attention to Scientology, its shortfalls are substantial enough to render it as an unreliable source of information about the organization."

Manca criticized the book for failing to include substantive analysis of several aspects within the controversial history of the Scientology organization, including its treatment in countries Germany and Belgium; lack of discussion regarding Scientology programs including Narconon, Criminon, World Literacy Crusade, and Applied Scholastics; dearth of coverage regarding use within the organization of the Suppressive Person jargon and related practice of Disconnection; scarcity of commentary on the successor to the organization's intelligence agency Guardian's Office with the Office of Special Affairs, and failure to cite critical scholarship on the subject matter. Manca noted that aside from simply neglecting to utilize key academic scholarship on the topic, the authors of chapters within Scientology also failed to seriously analyze material received from primary-sources including Scientology organization representatives. The review asserted, "This lack of critical inquiry leads to some conclusions that appear biased, involves the use of polarized language, and significantly diminishes the quality of information that might have challenged Scientology's claims regarding itself and its founder." The review criticized Scientology for the fact that two contributors had added a reference to Wikipedia to their essays – "citing questionable sources can produce questionable results, which in turn can discredit the value of academic research". Manca questioned the judgement of the book's publisher for allowing this type of writing practice, "It is surprising that editors at Oxford University Press allow Wikipedia to stand as an appropriate scholarly source in this or any volume."

The International Journal of Cultic Studies book review observed that the researchers were not removed in expressed point-of-view from the topic they wrote about, "Despite Lewis's claims, he and many of his contributors fail to remain neutral". Manca did not recommend the book for research on the Scientology organization, "Because of its numerous and varied shortcomings, this new book on Scientology is a poor sourcebook on the organization." Manca wrote that due to the poor quality of the work, the book itself could be cited as an example of problematic research, "Oddly enough, because of its numerous shortfalls and biases, Scientology may be useful to anyone who is studying the pro-cult/counter-cult debate and who wants to see numerous examples of biased scholarship by apparently polarized researchers." The review concluded, "As a reference for inquiry into Scientology, however, this book fails on many fronts."

Review by Marco Frenschkowski

A 30-page review by the German Protestant theologian and history of religion scholar Marco Frenschkowski in Alternative Spirituality and Religion Review stated that the book "simply put is the most
sophisticated academic item published on Scientology so far", adding that "this does not mean it will not be controversial, or that every statement in the book holds up to scrutiny." Describing it as a "serious attempt at bringing together what different fields of cultural studies (not just religious studies) can say about the most controversial of NRMs", the review pointed out that the contributors came from three continents and a variety of scholarly backgrounds, covering not only religious studies, but also such fields as sociology, psychology, philosophy, and judicial and cultural studies, helping it "to overcome the Americocentric and 'NRM-specialists' point of view".

Frenschkowski lauded Lewis's introduction, in which Lewis notes scholars' reluctance to publish Scientology research, given the organization's reputation as "a litigious organization, ready to sue anyone who dares criticize the Church", and addresses Scientologists' tendency to misunderstand the nature of the academic process. Frenschkowski described Melton's chapter as finding "a fine balance between critical observations and giving due weight to the point of view of devoted Scientologists [...] This does not mean defending Scientology: it means taking both members and critics seriously."

Frenschkowski welcomed Rothstein's chapter on the Xenu myth as an "important study", stating that it "defines a very good starting point for further research". He commented that Rothstein was right to praise "the anonymous Wikipedia article on the subject", a fact that was reflective of "the deeply unsatisfying state of affairs" that to date there had been not a single peer-reviewed journal article covering the topic. However, he wished Rothstein had contextualized the myth more with Hubbard's other space opera writings, and the science fiction field in general, and suggested more work needed to be done on this.

Frenschkowski listed some minor errors in the anthology, said he regretted the absence of a glossary, and was critical of the fact that there were several overlaps between various chapters; however, his main point of criticism was that apart from some new data based on the quantitative sociological approach, the book mainly presented overviews of data already known, stating that "this does not diminish the value of this fine collection, but the next academic publications on Scientology should not be once again overviews but monographs on special questions", "more specialized, in-depth studies on concepts, ideas and practices working with new data".

Towards the end of his review, Frenschkowski recalls the editor's prediction, made in the introduction, that the book would "likely end up pleasing no one engaged in the Scientology/anti-Scientology conflict, which is perhaps as it should be". Summing up, Frenschkowski states that the book pleased him, at any rate, and that he wished for it to be "read not just by academics but also e.g. by journalists [...]. It is the most important collection of articles on Scientology published so far – in any language."

Other reviews
The book received a critical analysis in the British satirical and current affairs magazine Private Eye. The review criticized the book for its unusually sympathetic tone and for not mentioning numerous notable controversies surrounding Scientology. Private Eye was critical of the book's presentation of asserted facts regarding the life of Scientology founder L. Ron Hubbard, as given in two separate instances in the book by contributors J. Gordon Melton and David G. Bromley. Melton stated his contribution gave, "an overview of the life of L. Ron Hubbard anchored by the general agreed facts", and Bromley asserted, "Although the basic outline of L. Ron Hubbard's life is not contested, the LRH persona has been a subject of particularly intense debate. Church critics have charged that many of the claims that Hubbard made about his own life and accomplishments are empirically false." The Private Eye review called this notion "poppycock", writing, "Everything about Scientology's founder is contested, though no one reading this book would realise that." As an example of disputed material about Hubbard's life, the review contrasted assertions by Melton about the military career of L. Ron Hubbard with documented United States Navy records cited by author Russell Miller in the biography, Bare-Faced Messiah.

The Private Eye review concluded by criticizing Oxford University Press for publishing the book: "What is utterly mystifying is why one of the oldest and most respected publishing houses in the world chooses to give its imprimatur to this tendentious drivel." When questioned by Private Eye, a spokesman for Oxford University Press responded, "Certainly this book was peer-reviewed." Private Eye joked that the peer reviewers of the book may have been controversial figures Lord Archer and Lord Black.

Richard Cimino, founder and editor of the Religioscope Institute-published newsletter Religion Watch, wrote that the book "focuses less on the church's abuses than on its organizational dynamics and teachings, although its authors do broach controversial issues." Cimino commented that the book is "divided about whether the movement and its distinctive blend of science, psychotherapy and esoteric religion is growing". In an article about Scientology by B.A. Robinson at the website of the organization Ontario Consultants on Religious Tolerance, Scientology is listed as a "recommended book".

See also

A Piece of Blue Sky
Bare-faced Messiah
Scientology and the legal system
Scientology controversies

References

Further reading

External links
Scientology, at website of publisher

2009 non-fiction books
Books about Scientology
Religious studies books
2009 in religion
Oxford University Press books